Mark Spencer, (born September 28, 1957, in Champaign, Illinois) is an American guitarist, steel guitarist, engineer, multi-instrumentalist, and musician currently based in Brooklyn, New York. An original member of seminal alt-country band Blood Oranges, he continues to work as an in-demand band member and sideman with a diverse range of new and established musical artists. He is currently a member of the band Son Volt, and appears on their 2009 release American Central Dust as lap and pedal steel guitarist, keyboardist, background vocalist, and engineer.

Gear
While Spencer plays many types of guitars from several manufacturers (Recording King, Hamer, First Act, Gretsch, Fender, Gibson, Collings, Supro, National, Bonanzinga), he most often uses Telecasters or similar solid-body guitars. Spencer is often seen performing using custom guitars from Creston Electric Instruments.

References

External links
 http://www.markspencer.us
 Son Volt Returns With New Album, Label

1957 births
Living people
Musicians from Champaign, Illinois
American rock guitarists
American country guitarists
American male guitarists
Steel guitarists
People from Franklin County, Vermont
Musicians from Brooklyn
Son Volt members
Guitarists from Illinois
Guitarists from New York (state)
20th-century American guitarists
Country musicians from New York (state)
Country musicians from Illinois
20th-century American male musicians